Linn-Kristin Riegelhuth Koren (born 1 August 1984) is a retired Norwegian handball player for the Norwegian national team, who last played for Larvik HK. She is commonly known as Linka. Outside handball she is a qualified nurse.

Career

Club career
Riegelhuth started playing handball at her hometown club Ski. She later played for Holmlia and Furuset until Larvik HK showed an interest for her. She was only 17 when she signed with Larvik for the 2002/03 season.

Riegelhuth was top scorer in the Norwegian league in the 2005/06 season (shared first place with Linn Jørum Sulland, both 159 goals). In 2006/07 she was again top scorer (221 goals), and was voted Player of the year in the Norwegian league. She won the Cup Winners' Cup in 2008 with Larvik. She also participated on the Champions League 2008/09 and was top scorer of the competition until Larvik was eliminated.

In January 2009, Riegelhuth signed a two-year contract with Danish club FCK Håndbold where she will start playing at the end of the 2008/09 season.

National team
She made her debut on the Norwegian national team in 2003, and has played 268 matches and scored 965 goals as of July 2015. She is five time European champion from 2004, 2006, 2008, 2010 and 2014. She was the top scorer in the 2008 European Championship and was also awarded a place in the all-star team as Best Right Wing. She received a silver medal at the 2007 World Women's Handball Championship and a gold medal at the 2008 Summer Olympics and at the 2012 Summer Olympics.

Personal life
She's the older sister of fellow handball player, Betina Riegelhuth. On 25 June 2011, Linn-Kristin Riegelhuth married Einar Sand Koren, and changed her name to Linn-Kristin Riegelhuth Koren. In May 2015 she announced that she and her husband was expecting their first child, and had to take a break from handball. After giving birth 22 December 2015, Riegelhuth Koren was back playing for Larvik against Rælingen HK on 2 March 2016.

In October 2017 she announced that she's expecting her second child, but she will come back on court again.

Today she has three kids: Lotte, Pelle og Lasse together with Einar.

Team results
Club
 Champions League: Semi-finalist in 2003/04 (Larvik)
 Cup Winners' Cup: Winner in 2004/05 and 2007/08 (Larvik)
 Norwegian Championship: Winner in 2004, 2005, 2006, 2007 and 2008 (Larvik)
 Norwegian Cup: Winner in 2003, 2004, 2005, 2006 and 2008; Runner-up in 2007 (Larvik)

National team
 European Championship: Gold in 2004, 2006, 2008, 2010 and 2014; Silver in 2012
 World Championship: Silver in 2007; Gold in 2011
 Summer Olympics: Gold in 2008 and 2012; Bronze in 2016

Awards and recognition
 Player of the year of the Norwegian league in 2007
 Right wing on the All-Star Team and Top scorer of the 2008 European Championship
 Right wing on the All-Star Team in the 2009 World Championship
 Awarded Tønsbergs Blad's yearly price, Kristinastatuetten, in 2008
 Voted female World Handball Player of the Year 2008 by a jury of experts from the IHF
 All-Star Team Best Right Wing of the EHF Champions League: 2015

References

External links

1984 births
Living people
Norwegian female handball players
Handball players at the 2008 Summer Olympics
Handball players at the 2012 Summer Olympics
Handball players at the 2016 Summer Olympics
Olympic handball players of Norway
Olympic gold medalists for Norway
Olympic bronze medalists for Norway
Olympic medalists in handball
Medalists at the 2008 Summer Olympics
Medalists at the 2012 Summer Olympics
Medalists at the 2016 Summer Olympics
People from Ski, Norway
Norwegian expatriate sportspeople in Denmark
Expatriate handball players
Sportspeople from Viken (county)